Julie Tan (born 22 September 1992  in Penang, Malaysia) is a Singaporean actress. She was the female lead in That Girl in Pinafore. Tan left MediaCorp as a full-time artiste in 2017.

Early life
Julie Tan was born in Malaysia. She received her education in Singapore and studied Drama at the Nanyang Academy of Fine Arts.

Career
In 2008, she debuted in the telemovie The Promise as a girl with intellectual disability. She was also the first runner-up in The New Paper's New Face.

In 2010, Tan starred in television episodes, including The Illusionist, No Limits and New Beginnings. She auditioned for Alpha Entertainment in 2011, and was given a chance to be part of K-pop girl group Skarf, which she turned down. She worked in television dramas A Tale of 2 Cities and A Song to Remember, as one of the female leads.

In 2013, she starred in movies Judgement Day and That Girl in Pinafore. She became the host for A Date with K-pop Stars, which debuted on 21 February 2014, where she travelled to South Korea and spent time with idols.

In 2013, Tan got her first individual lead role starring in 96°C Café. In the same year, she also starred in Gonna Make It. In 2015, Tan starred in The Dream Makers II as the main villain. It was her breakthrough role and she won her first acting award starring as Dong Zihuai in the drama. In May 2016, it was announced that Tan will take a 6-month break from acting in order to take a four-month acting course at New York Film Academy's school of acting.

Filmography

Telemovies

Accolades

References

Living people
Singaporean television personalities
Malaysian people of Chinese descent
Malaysian emigrants to Singapore
1992 births